GOM Player is a media player for Windows, developed by GOM & Company. With more than 100 million downloads, it is also known as the most used player in South Korea. Its main features include the ability to play some broken media files and find missing codecs using a codec finder service.

The word gom (곰) means "bear" in Korean, and as such the icon of GOM Player looks like a bear's paw.

GOM Player has a free version and a paid version. The paid version name is GOM Player Plus, and it allows video playback without advertisements and includes convenient features such as simple configuration.

Features 
 GOM Player has several embedded  video and audio codecs, so it can play immediately without installing any external codecs. If there is no codec, it can be found with a codec search feature.
The basic embedded codec has the advantage of making it easier for computer beginners who lack knowledge of codecs to play videos.
Video files that are incomplete, damaged, or not completely downloaded can also be played.
If the file name of a video file and subtitles are the same, subtitles are automatically displayed when the video is running.
If there is no subtitle file, subtitles can be found in the subtitles archive supported by GOM Player.
GOM Player started supporting 360 video (360VR) for the first time as a domestic video player in December 2015, and also has supported 360 video on GOM Player mobile app since June 2016.
360 degree videos and trending videos on YouTube can be played through the right panel called Miniweb.
In 2019, the preferences of GOM player were newly reorganized.
In 2020, a new version of GOM player macOS was released.
GOM player is available on mobile (Android/iOS).
In 2020, the company released a new GOM Player app optimized for iPhones.

Supported formats 
GOM Player can play following multimedia formats
Video Formats: [Windows]avi, .ogm, .mkv, .mp4, .k3g, .ifo, .ts, .asf, .wmv, .wma, .mov, .mpg, .m1v, .m2v, .vob, .m4v, .3gp/3gp2, .rmvb, .rm, .ogg, .flv, .asx(영상), .dat + When an external codec is used, other video formats can also be used. - [Mac].mkv, .mp4, .avi, .m4v, .mov, .3gp, .ts, .mts, .m2ts, .wmv, .flv, .f4v, .asf, .webm, .rm, .rmvb, .qt, .dv, .mpg, .mpeg, .mxf, .vob, .gif
Audio Formats: [Windows].mp3, .m4a, .aac, .ogg, .flac, .wav, .wma, .rma , .alac + When an external codec is used, other audio formats can also be used. - [Mac].mp3, .aac, .mka, .flac, .ogg, .oga, .mogg, .m4a, .opus, .wav, .wv, .aiff, .ape, .tta, .tak
Subtitle Formats: [Windows]smi, srt, rt, sub(& IDX), vtt (text sub), dvb, ass, psb, txt, sbv, vobsub (embedded sub) - [Mac]utf, utf8, utf-8, idx, sub, srt, smi, rt, ssa, aqt, jss, js, ass, mks, vtt, sup, scc
Playist Formats - [Windows].asx, .pls - [Mac]json (self-formatting)

See also 
 Comparison of video player software
 Comparison of video codecs
 List of codecs

References

External links 
  Official GOM Software Website
  Official GOM & Company Website
 Software Review by Softpedia

Windows media players
Windows-only freeware
South Korean brands
Software DVD players
2003 software